In phonetics, clipping is the process of shortening the articulation of a phonetic segment, usually a vowel. A clipped vowel is pronounced more quickly than an unclipped vowel and is often also reduced.

Examples

Dutch
Particularly in Netherlands Dutch, vowels in unstressed syllables are shortened and centralized, which is particularly noticeable with tense vowels; compare the  phoneme in   'rabbit' and   'king'.

English
Many dialects of English (such as Australian English, General American English, Received Pronunciation, South African English and Standard Canadian English) have two types of non-phonemic clipping: pre-fortis clipping and rhythmic clipping.

The first type occurs in a stressed syllable before a fortis consonant, so that e.g. bet  has a vowel that is shorter than the one in bed . Vowels preceding voiceless consonants that begin a next syllable (as in keychain ) are not affected by this rule.

Rhythmic clipping occurs in polysyllabic words. The more syllables a word has, the shorter its vowels are and so the first vowel of readership is shorter than in reader, which, in turn, is shorter than in read.

Clipping with vowel reduction also occurs in many unstressed syllables.

Neither type of transcription is more correct, as both convey exactly the same information, but transcription systems that use the length mark make it more clear whether a vowel is checked or free.

The Scottish vowel length rule is used instead of those rules in Scotland and sometimes also in Northern Ireland.

Serbo-Croatian
Many speakers of Serbo-Croatian from Croatia and Serbia pronounce historical unstressed long vowels as short, with some exceptions (such as genitive plural endings).

See also
 Apheresis (linguistics)
 Clipping (morphology)
 Syncope (phonetics)
 Vowel reduction

References

Bibliography

 
 
 

Phonetics